Psycho Motel was a British hard rock band, formed by Iron Maiden guitarist Adrian Smith.

History
The band was formed in 1995 by Iron Maiden guitarist Adrian Smith after he left Maiden in 1990. Smith briefly experimented with a project called ASAP (Adrian Smith and Project) before seemingly retiring from the music industry altogether in 1990. However, it was a chance meeting with Jamie Stewart, formerly bass guitarist with The Cult and Carl Dufresne that finally persuaded Smith back into the spotlight. 

Quote from Adrian Smith, as quoted from the State of Mind cover.

However, Stewart soon quit the project and was replaced by bassist Gary Leideman. In 1993, The Untouchables (featuring Smith on vocals, Carl Dufresne, Gary Leideman and Fabio DelRio). Dufresne and DelRio soon left the band and Smith decided to extend the line-up by bringing in singer Solli, a Norwegian who had been working with Thin Lizzy guitarist Scott Gorham in 21 Guns. A demo impressed enough for the band to land a recording deal. They changed their name to Psycho Motel and debuted with the album State of Mind in 1995, followed by Welcome to the World in 1997.

As far as Smith was concerned, the two records were distinct from each other:

Quote from Adrian Smith, as quoted from the Welcome to the World album cover.

After the release of Welcome To The World, Smith went to help on two albums and two tours with Bruce Dickinson. After this, they both re-joined Iron Maiden in 1999, and Psycho Motel split up. When asked if he would consider re-forming the band in 2001, he said that they had "no plans at the moment" but they would "possibly do some stuff next year". This has yet to happen with his continued success with Iron Maiden.

In 2006, both albums were re-released, Welcome to the World was released with two bonus tracks, "Wait" and "Just Like A Woman".

On an interview in 1996 Adrian confirmed Psycho Motel was formerly known as "Skeleton Crew". The band was a trio and Adrian was doing all the vocals. Shortly after the drummer quit, Solli was recruited along with Mike Sturgis. The name Psycho Motel came from a previous demo.

Personnel
Andy Makin - Vocals
Adrian Smith - Guitars, backing vocals
Gary Leideman - Bass
Mike Sturgis - Drums
(Hans Olav) Solli - Vocals (State of Mind)
Jamie Stewart - Bass in The Untouchables
Carl Dufresne- Guitars, Keys, vocals in The Untouchables
Huwey Lucas - Guitars in The Untouchables
Bob Richards - Drums in The Untouchables
Fabio Del Rio -  Drums in The Untouchables

Discography

Studio albums
State of Mind (1995)
Welcome to the World (1997)

References

English rock music groups